Nine species of vulture can be found living in India, but most are now in danger of extinction after a rapid and major population collapse in recent decades. In the early 1980s, three species of Gyps vultures (the white-rumped vulture, the long-billed vulture and the slender-billed vulture) had a combined estimated population of 40 million in South Asia, but as of 2017, the total population numbered only 19,000 (6,000, 12,000, and 1,000 respectively). With a catastrophic loss of over 99.95% of all the vultures in South Asia, the Indian vulture crisis represents the sharpest decline of any animal known to man in the same number of years. A major contributing factor in declining populations of vultures is believed to be widespread use of drugs such as diclofenac, once commonly used as a livestock anti-inflammatory drug. Veterinary usage of diclofenac has been banned in India since 2006. The IUCN Red Data Book has listed Gyps bengalensis as "critically endangered". In winter 2012, 56 vultures in three species (Eurasian griffon, cinereous vulture, Egyptian vulture) and 10 steppe eagles were found dead at a dumping site in Jorbeer, Rajasthan. Six Eurasian griffons were found dead in May 2013 due to dehydration and wing weakness. The area has been declared as a conserved forest area, but the carcass dumping site is not part of the protected area. 

The dramatic vulture decline observed across India presents a range of ecological threats, by influencing the numbers and distribution of other scavenging species. Increased feral dog populations have been reported all over India, posing many associated disease risks such as rabies to humans and wildlife. India already accounts for a very high incidence of rabies cases, and an absolute shortage of quality anti-rabies vaccine in rural areas can aggravate the problem even further. Similarly, increased crow populations at carcass sites near settlement areas pose a risk of infections to poultry, domesticated birds, and humans. Prevalence and concentration of diclofenac residues in ungulate carcasses is important for India's threatened vulture populations. A small proportion (< 0.8%) of ungulate carcasses containing lethal levels of diclofenac is enough to cause the observed rapid decline of vultures population. (Bohra D L)

Vultures previously played an important role in public sanitation in India and their disappearance has resulted in a number of problems, and as such numerous conservation schemes are in place to assist in the recovery of vulture populations.

History
Vultures in India live in communities and are generally very dependent on human activities. The Hindu religion, which represents 80% of the country's population, is particularly favorable to vultures. Cows are considered sacred by majority of Hindus, so cow meat is generally not consumed. This results in the cow's corpse being left to be fed on by vultures. Of the estimated 500 million cattle in India, only 4% were destined for consumption by humans as meat. Vultures constituted the natural animal disposal system, processing carcasses and nearly 15,000 vultures have been observed at the carcass depositories in capital New Delhi.

Decline
In the 1990s, a decrease in the number of vultures was noted by Vibhu Prakash of the Bombay Natural History Society, who had monitored vulture populations at Keoladeo National Park. As the decline accelerated, the international scientific community attempted to investigate the cause of such decline. However, it was not easy to examine this issue because vultures could not legally be killed for scientific study in India, and freshly dead animals had become extremely rare, a situation exacerbated by the extremely hot weather in India where temperatures before the monsoon routinely exceed . In 2002, National Geographic reported that scientists were "not sure" of the reason for the 95% population decline. Andrew Cunningham of the Zoological Society of London found that the usual suspects of pesticide poisoning, industrial pollutants or bacteria did not show anything abnormal in the vultures he could examine and suspected a new type of toxin exposure.

Causes
In 2003, after research on the possible viral causes of the decline, the culprit was discovered by Dr. Lindsay Oaks and his team at The Peregrine Fund to be diclofenac. Diclofenac is a common anti-inflammatory drug administered to livestock and is used to treat the symptoms of inflammation, fevers and/or pain associated with disease or wounds. It was widely used in India beginning in the 1990s. The drug is fatal to vultures, however, and a vulture gets exposed to a mortal dose of diclofenac on eating from the carcass of an animal that has been treated with diclofenac recently. A simulation model demonstrated that if only 1% of carcasses were contaminated by diclofenac, Indian vulture populations would fall by between 60% and 90% annually, and a study of carcasses showed that about 10% were contaminated.

A genus of vultures called Gyps was the most affected by diclofenac. The population of the white-rumped vulture (Gyps bengalensis) fell 99.7% between 1993 and 2002. The populations of the Indian vulture (Gyps indicus) and the slender-billed vulture (Gyps tenuirostris) fell 97.4%. The percentages differ slightly because the white-rumped vulture is more sensitive to diclofenac than the other two species, but all three were in danger of extinction. Two other species of Gyps, the Himalayan vulture (Gyps himalayensis) and the Eurasian griffon (Gyps fulvus) were less affected, the Eurasian griffon because it only winters in India and has a much smaller initial population, and the Himalayan vulture, with a similarly small population, because it is exclusively mountain-dwelling.

Consequences
The sudden collapse of the natural animal disposal system in India has had multiple consequences. The carcasses formerly eaten by vultures rot in village fields leading to contaminated drinking water. The disappearance of vultures has allowed other species such as rat and feral dog populations to grow. These newly abundant scavengers are not as efficient as vultures. A vulture's metabolism is a true “dead-end” for pathogens, but dogs and rats become carriers of the pathogens. India has an estimated 18 million feral dogs, the largest population of carnivores in the world, which has led to increase in leopards invading inhabited areas preying on feral dogs leading to conflicts with humans.

The mammals also carry diseases from rotting carcasses such as rabies, anthrax, plague etc. and are indirectly responsible for thousands of human deaths. In India, 30,000 people die from rabies each year, more than half the world's total. In addition to the cost of care, the government faces the problem of managing the population of disease carriers. Vaccination and sterilization of animals cost money.

According to Parsi beliefs, Earth, Fire, and Water are sacred elements, and both cremation and burial are sacrilegious. For the deceased Parsi to reach heaven, vultures serve as intermediaries between earth and sky. The dead body is placed on a Tower of Silence where vultures, by consuming the body, liberate the soul. Due to the decline in vulture population, Parsis have been obliged to drop these ancient customs for reasons of hygiene, since now bodies take six months to disappear.

Reaction

Diclofenac regulation 
Following the findings on diclofenac, the drug was banned for veterinary use in India on March 11, 2006; Nepal followed suit in August, 2006, and Pakistan shortly thereafter. A replacement drug was quickly developed and proposed after tests on vultures in captivity: meloxicam. Meloxicam affects cattle the same way as diclofenac, but is harmless for vultures. Diclofenac for human use was still being diverted into veterinary uses through black markets in certain parts of India as of 2009.

Despite the vulture crisis, diclofenac remains available in other countries including many in Europe. It was controversially approved for veterinary use in Spain in 2013 and continues to be available, despite Spain being home to around 90% of the European vulture population and an independent simulation showing that the drug could reduce the population of vultures by 1–8% annually. Spain's medicine agency presented simulations suggesting that the number of deaths would be quite small.  New sanitary regulation laws regarding animal carcass disposal in Spain also reduce the amount of available food for vultures while adding to costs and greenhouse emissions.

Vulture breeding 
As of 2002, the Parsis had asked the UK National Birds of Prey Centre for assistance with vulture breeding.

See also 
 African vulture crisis
 Critically Endangered

Notes

References

External links
Saving Asia's Vultures from Extinction
Vulture Rescue
The Peregrine Fund - Asian Vulture Crisis
Bombay Natural History Society - Vulture Program

Endangered animals
Environmental disasters in India
Birds of India